USS Vogelgesang (DE-284) was a proposed United States Navy Rudderow-class destroyer escort that was never completed.

Vogelgesang was laid down at the Charleston Navy Yard, sometime in 1943. The contract for her construction was cancelled on 12 March 1944 before she could be launched, and the incomplete ship was scrapped.

The name Vogelgesang was transferred to the destroyer USS Vogelgesang (DD-862).

References 

NavSource Naval History: Photographic History of The U.S. Navy: Destroyer Escorts, Frigates, Littoral Warfare Vessels

Rudderow-class destroyer escorts
Cancelled ships of the United States Navy
Ships built in Charleston, South Carolina